Jeong Yu-mi is a South Korean actress. She is best known for starring in Rooftop Prince, Six Flying Dragons, and Partners for Justice.

Career
Jeong Yu-mi made her entertainment debut in a Lotte Xylitol chewing gum commercial in 2003. After playing minor roles in several TV series and movies, she became a household name when she portrayed a gentle girlfriend in A Thousand Days' Promise (2011) and a scheming secretary in Rooftop Prince (2012).

Having previously appeared in the Chinese drama Five Star Hotel (2007), Jeong starred opposite Leon Lai and Gao Yuanyuan in the Chinese film Nobleman's Path (2012).

She was cast in the revenge manhwa-turned-TV series City Conquest, but the project was eventually cancelled after it couldn't secure a timeslot. Instead, Jeong starred in the family drama Wonderful Mama (2013) in her first leading role.

In September 2013, she joined the season 4 cast of dating reality show We Got Married, where she was paired with singer Jung Joon-young. She later appeared in the music video for Jung's single "The Sense of an Ending." The same year, she was cast in her first big screen leading role for the horror film Tunnel 3D.

Jeong next headlined the daily drama Mother's Garden (2014) and period drama More Than a Maid (2015). She then took on a supporting role in the historical drama Six Flying Dragons.

In 2016, Jung was cast as the female lead in revenge drama The Master of Revenge. In 2017, she headlined the weekend drama Bravo My Life.

In 2018, Jung was cast in the crime drama Partners for Justice as a rookie prosecutor. She next starred in the medical exorcism drama Priest.

In July 2021, Jung signed a contract with Mystic Story.

Personal life 
On February 4, 2020, it was confirmed that Jung is in a relationship with singer Kangta.

Filmography

Film

Television series

Variety show

Music video

Dj Radio

Awards and nominations

References

External links

  
 
 
 

Actresses from Busan
South Korean film actresses
South Korean television actresses
1984 births
Living people
L&Holdings artists
21st-century South Korean actresses
Hanyang University alumni